The Palugvik Site, also known as Palugvik Archeological District, is an archaeological site on Hawkins Island in Prince William Sound, near Cordova, Alaska, within Chugach National Forest.  The site, first excavated in 1930, was the first to provide a view of prehistoric human habitation in Prince William Sound, the ancestral home of the Chugach people, and is one of the two primary sites for identifying the sequence of occupation in the area.  The site was declared a National Historic Landmark in 1962, and listed on the National Register of Historic Places in 1966.

Description
The Palugvik site is located on the rocky shore of Hawkins Island, just west of the city of Cordova. The major feature of the site is a shell midden, and was at a somewhat higher elevation at the time of its human occupation.

The first major archaeological survey of Prince William Sound was conducted in the 1930s by pioneering archaeologist Frederica de Laguna, at which time she led a major excavation at Palugvik. The site also includes fragmented remnants of a residence, burial sites, and other artifacts. The evidence gathered dates the site from c. 500 BCE to the European contact period. The 1930 excavations yielded about 1100 artifacts. It also yielded information about the diet and hunting habits of the inhabitants, which including a significant marine diet of fish, several species of whale, as well as land-based fauna including marmot.

See also
List of National Historic Landmarks in Alaska
National Register of Historic Places listings in Chugach Census Area, Alaska

References

Geography of Chugach Census Area, Alaska
National Historic Landmarks in Alaska
National Register of Historic Places in Chugach Census Area, Alaska